Alcmaeon of Croton (Alkmaiōn, gen.: Ἀλκμαίωνος; fl. 5th century BC) was an early Greek medical writer and philosopher-scientist. He has been described as one of the most eminent natural philosophers and medical theorists of antiquity and he has also been referred to as "a thinker of considerable originality and one of the greatest philosophers, naturalists, and neuroscientists of all time." His work in biology has been described as remarkable, and his originality made him likely a pioneer. Because of difficulties dating Alcmaeon's birth, his importance has been neglected.

Biography
Alcmaeon was born in Croton and was the son of Peirithous. Alcmaeon is said by some to have been a pupil of Pythagoras, and he is believed to have been born c. 510 BC. Although he wrote primarily about medical topics, there is some suggestion that he was a philosopher of science, not a physician. He also practiced astrology and meteorology.  Nothing more is known of the events of his life.

Work
During Alcmaeon's time, the medical school in Magna Graecia was regarded as the most famous; illnesses were studied in a scientific and experimental manner. Alcmaeon was considered by many an early pioneer and advocate of anatomical dissection and was said to be the first to identify Eustachian tubes.  His celebrated discoveries in the field of dissection were noted in antiquity, but whether his knowledge in this branch of science was derived from the dissection of animals or of human bodies is disputed.  Calcidius, on whose authority the fact rests, merely says "qui primus exsectionem aggredi est ausus," and the word exsectio would apply equally well in either case; some modern scholars doubt Calcidius' word entirely.

Alcmaeon also was the first to dwell on the internal causes of illnesses. It was he who first suggested that health was a state of equilibrium between opposing humors and that illnesses were because of problems in environment, nutrition and lifestyle. A book titled On Nature is attributed to him, though the original title may be different, as Alexandrian writers were known to have ascribed the title "On Nature" to a wide variety of works. According to Favorinus's account, Alcmaeon has been the first who wrote such a treatise on natural philosophy, however this has been disputed, because Anaximander wrote before Alcmaeon. Accounts which attribute an Alcmaeon of Croton to be the first to write animal fables, may be a reference to a poet with the same name.  He also wrote several other medical and philosophical works, of which nothing but the titles and a few fragments have been preserved by Stobaeus, Plutarch, and Galen.

Surviving fragments attributed to Alcmaeon include, "The earth is the mother of plants and the sun their father", and maybe also, "Experience is the beginning of learning", attributed to an Spartan poet named Alcman.

Study of the senses
Calcidius' commentary on Plato's Timaeus praises Alcmaeon (as well as Callisthenes and Herophilus), about their work on the nature of the eye. He mentions that Alcmaeon excised an animal eye to study the optic nerve. However, there is no evidence that Alcmaeon himself dissected the eye or the skull. Based on this observation, and more rudimentary, Alcmaeon described the senses, except for the touch sense.  These observations contributed to the study of medicine by establishing the connection between the brain and the sense organs, and outlined the paths of the optic nerves as well as stating that the brain is the organ of the mind. Many scholars believe that Plato referred to Alcmaeon's work, when writing in Phaedo about the senses and how we or animals think.  He also stated that the eye contains both fire and water, with vision occurring once something is seen and reflected by the gleaming and translucent part of the eye.

Other studies
Alcmaeon said that sleep occurs by the withdrawal of blood, away from the surface of the body, to larger blood-flowing vessels, and that one becomes awake again once the blood returns. And if the blood withdraws entirely, death occurs. It has been suggested that Hippocratic authors, and Aristotle, adopted Alcmaeon’s views on sleep. There are also accounts of him about embryology, how a child develops, and analogies with animals and plants about human physiology. Because of the little evidence, there exists controversy to what extent Alcmaeon can be considered as a Presocratic cosmologist, or if at all.

Pythagorean
Although Alcmaeon is often described as a pupil of Pythagoras, there are reasons to doubt whether he was a Pythagorean at all; his name seems to have crept into lists of Pythagoreans given us by later writers.  Aristotle mentions him as nearly contemporary with Pythagoras, but distinguishes between the stoicheia of opposites, under which the Pythagoreans included all things; and the double principle of Alcmaeon, according to Aristotle, less extended, although he does not explain the precise difference. Since 1950 the scholarly consensus holds that Alcmaeon of Croton is a figure independent of the Pythagoreans.

Other doctrines of Alcmaeon have been preserved.  He said that the human soul was immortal and partook of the divine nature, because like the heavenly bodies it contained in itself a principle of motion.  The eclipse of the moon, which was also eternal, he supposed to arise from its shape, which he said was like a boat.  All his doctrines which have come down to us relate to physics or medicine; and seem to have arisen partly out of the speculations of the Ionian School, with which rather than the Pythagorean, Aristotle appears to connect Alcmaeon, partly from the traditional lore of the earliest medical science.

See also
Galen of Pergamon – influenced by Alcmaeon of Croton
Hippocrates

Notes

References

Attribution

Further reading

External links

5th-century BC Greek physicians
5th-century BC philosophers
Ancient Crotonians
Ancient Greek anatomists
Ancient Greek metaphysicians
Ancient Greek science writers
Presocratic philosophers
Pythagoreans of Magna Graecia
Ancient ophthalmologists